Vatica brevipes is a tree in the family Dipterocarpaceae, native to Borneo. The specific epithet brevipes means "short foot", referring to the petiole.

Description
The inflorescences bear cream flowers.

Distribution and habitat
Vatica brevipes is endemic to Borneo.

Conservation
Vatica brevipes has been assessed as near threatened on the IUCN Red List. It is threatened mainly by land conversion for agriculture and palm oil plantations.

References

brevipes
Endemic flora of Borneo
Plants described in 1978